Pura Vida Coffee is a for-profit company wholly owned by Pura Vida Create Good, a nonprofit U.S. company. It sells Fair Trade Certified organic, shade-grown coffee from Latin America and Africa. The company advocates corporate social responsibility by donating its profits to help children and families in coffee-growing communities internationally.

Pura Vida Create Good, a 501(c)(3) nonprofit that serves as the philanthropic division of the company, is funded by coffee sales and corporate and private donations. Pura Vida Partners works with coffee co-ops and local charitable agencies to deliver community-driven projects promoting self-reliance in the areas of economic, health, and education.

Founded in 1997 and headquartered in Tukwila, Washington, Pura Vida also provides profit sharing opportunities for nonprofit organizations such as Sister Schools, FundaVida, and Ecofiltro.

References

External links 
Pura Vida Coffee web site

Coffee brands
Fair trade brands